Ezequiel Uricoechea Rodríguez (Bogotá, 9 April 1834 – Beirut, 29 July 1880) was a Colombian linguist and scientist. He is considered one of the first Colombian scientists and a pioneer in Spanish-language linguistics.

Biography 
Uricoechea was born in Santa Fe de Bogotá in what was then the Republic of New Granada, his family being of Basque origin. His father was José María de Uricoechea y Zornoza, and his mother Mariana Rodríguez Moreno. He had a brother, Sabas María, and a sister; Filomena. He graduated from Yale Medical School in 1852. In 1853 he became Doctor of Philosophy at University of Göttingen, after which he went to Brussels where he assisted Adolphe Quetelet at the Royal Observatory of Belgium. He afterwards visited Paris and London for the purpose of extending his scientific knowledge, and on his return to Bogotá founded a college for the higher branches of science, where he delivered lectures on chemistry, his favorite subject, and the theme of several of his published monographs.

Uricoechea was also an able philologist, and while in Bogotá made many excursions to collect materials for the study of the languages and archaeology of extinct peoples. The revolutions in New Granada caused him to return to Europe, where he had leisure for his favorite researches. While residing in Spain and Morocco he made such progress in Arabic that when a chair of that language was founded in the University of Brussels, he was assigned as professor. He had only accomplished the work appropriate to his new chair a translation into French of Carl Paul Caspari's Arabic Grammar, when he died of dysentery, in Beirut, then part of the Ottoman Empire, on July 28, 1880. Uricoechea went to Beirut for further study of Arabic in the locality where it was considered to have the purest accent.

He was also the author of various works on the antiquities and native languages of Spanish America, and of a valuable catalogue of the maps relating to the same region.

See also 

List of Muisca scholars
Chibcha language

References

External links 
 
 

University of Göttingen alumni
1834 births
1880 deaths
Linguists from Colombia
Muisca scholars
Academic staff of the Free University of Brussels (1834–1969)
Yale School of Medicine alumni
Colombian people of Basque descent
_
Colombian expatriates in the United States
Colombian expatriates in Belgium
Colombian expatriates in the Netherlands
Expatriates in the Ottoman Empire